Bushimaie Hunting Reserve is a protected area in Kasai-Central Province of the Democratic Republic of the Congo.

The reserve is in the Southern Congolian forest–savanna mosaic ecoregion.

References 

Protected areas of the Democratic Republic of the Congo
Southern Congolian forest–savanna mosaic
Kasaï-Central